Evaristo Márquez (August 23, 1939 – June 15, 2013), was a Colombian actor and herdsman best known for his role as José Dolores in the film Burn!, acting alongside Marlon Brando under the direction of Gillo Pontecorvo.

Biography 
Before his involvement with Pontecorvo he was a herdsman and illiterate. Márquez appeared in three more movies during the 1970s.  With the decline of his film career, Márquez returned to work as a herdsman
Of his experience with Brando, Márquez said "he never made me feel inferior to him, he regarded me as a brother", and "indeed, there was no one like Brando; that way of changing the expression of his face, of his eyes;  even more, he was a brave man."
In 2008 Márquez appeared in Chimbumbe, short film shown at the Cartagena Film Festival.
In August 2010 Márquez appeared in El Tambor Magico, a short film made by San Basilio de Palenque children.

He lived in San Basilio de Palenque, Colombia. Marquez died at a hospital in Cartagena, Colombia on June 15, 2013. He was 73.

Filmography

Film
El Tambor Magico (2010)
Chimbumbe (2008)
Mulato (1974)
Cumbia (1973)
Arde (1971)
Il dio serpente (1970)
Burn! (1969) as José Dolores

References

External links 
 
 
 Burn! at Film Forum
 Violence and the wretched: The cinema of Gillo Pontecorbo

1939 births
2013 deaths
20th-century Colombian male actors
21st-century Colombian male actors
Colombian male film actors